Helen's Trust is a nonprofit organization located in Derbyshire, England in the United Kingdom. It aims to enable people with any terminal illness to have the choice to stay in their own home. Originally established in Baslow, the charity now supports people throughout north Derbyshire and Sheffield, providing a help at recipients homes. The organization supports those in need with home care respite, equipment acquisitions, household chores, and additional tasks needed to support those with terminal illness to stay at home.

History
The charity was named after Helen Louise Lyon (1956-2001). Lyon died from breast cancer. Lyon focused on living a normal life, living at her home instead of entering a hospital when her cancer worsened. The charity launched one week after her funeral, in 2001.

President and Patrons
The Duchess of Devonshire is the president of the Trust. Patrons included Dominic West, who became involved after his mother wished to stay at home during the final stages of an illness, and Roy Hattersley.

References

External links

Health charities in the United Kingdom
Charities based in Derbyshire